Diego Occhiuzzi (born 30 April 1981) is an Italian fencer and olympic medal winner in team sabre competition. At the 2012 Summer Olympics he competed in the Men's sabre where he lost to Áron Szilágyi in the final round to win the silver medal.  He was also part of the Italian men's sabre team that won the bronze medal.

Achievements
Occhiuzzi has been most successful in team events, having won a bronze Olympic medals in both 2008 and 2012, a bronze, a silver, and another bronze from the 2007, 2010, and 2011 World Fencing Championships, and a gold from both the 2013 and 2014 European Fencing Championships. However, his best result is having placed second in the individual event at the 2012 Olympics. In the finals, he lost to Áron Szilágyi, 15–8.

References

Italian male sabre fencers
Olympic fencers of Italy
Fencers at the 2008 Summer Olympics
Fencers at the 2012 Summer Olympics
Fencers at the 2016 Summer Olympics
Olympic silver medalists for Italy
Olympic bronze medalists for Italy
1981 births
Living people
Fencers from Naples
Olympic medalists in fencing
Medalists at the 2012 Summer Olympics
Medalists at the 2008 Summer Olympics
Fencers of Centro Sportivo Aeronautica Militare